Bethylus is a genus of insects belonging to the family Bethylidae.

The species of this genus are found in Europe and Northern America.

Species:
 Bethylus apteryx Kieffer, 1905 
 Bethylus berlandi Arlé, 1929

References

Bethylidae
Hymenoptera genera